Despite may refer to:
 A common preposition
 Despite (band), A Swedish metal band
 USS Despite (AM-89), an Adroit-class minesweeper of the United States Navy